Nee Tata Naa Birla is a 2008 Indian Kannada-language comedy film directed and scripted by Nagendra Magadi. The film has an ensemble cast including V. Ravichandran, Jaggesh, Pooja Gandhi, Jennifer Kotwal, Nikita Thukral and Keerthi Chawla in the leading roles. It is based on the 1985 Malayalam movie Boeing Boeing.

The film revolves around two con men (Ravichandran and Jaggesh) who are experts at stealing from the rich and giving it to the poor. In this process, they are approached by a well known don who gives them a deal of wooing two young girls, who work for the bank. The assignment is to get the code numbers from both the girls and loot the money from the bank. The film takes on the comical track about how the men succeed in their assignment and how they face their real families.

Cast 

 V. Ravichandran as Ravi
 Jaggesh as Jaggu
 Jennifer Kotwal as Teju
 Pooja Gandhi as Pooja
 Keerthi Chawla
 Nikita Thukral
 Urvashi as Draupadi(Cook)
 Doddanna
 Sadhu Kokila
 Satyajith
 Karibasavaiah
 Jyothi Rana
 Rekha Das
 Sundar Raj
 Harish Rai

Soundtrack 
The music was composed by Gurukiran and lyrics written by V. Manohar and Hrudaya Shiva. A total of 5 tracks have been composed for the film and the audio rights brought by Skanda Audio.

Reception

Critical response 

R G Vijayasarathy of Rediff.com scored the film at 1.5 out of 5 stars and wrote "Ravichandran's comedy timing is always perfect, and he shines in here too though the same cannot be said of a repetitious Jaggesh. Jennifer and Pooja Gandhi are seen mostly in song and dance sequences. The other girls just come and go. Only a fan of Ravichandran and Jaggesh will call this even a time pass film".

References

External links 

 Film at GGpedia
 Indiaglitz review
 Bharat Student review

2008 films
2000s Kannada-language films
Indian comedy films
Films scored by Gurukiran
Films about con artists
2008 comedy films